The Raid on Le Havre was a two-day naval bombardment of the French port of Le Havre early in July 1759 by Royal Navy forces under Rear-Admiral George Rodney during the Seven Years' War, which succeeded in its aim of destroying many of the invasion barges being gathered there for the planned French invasion of Great Britain.

Background
By the summer of 1759 the duc de Choiseul's invasion plans was under way with intensive naval preparations taking place along the French ports in the Atlantic and in the channel – Brest, Le Havre, Rochefort and Toulon. Troops were assembled at number of points principally at Dunkirk, Saint-Omer, Ostend, Lille and Vannes. Choiseul had decided that the Le Havre was to be the main base for the Prince de Soubise's strike at England as it lay on the Seine and troop movement was far easier than any other French port.

The British had received intelligence that the French had a number of flat bottomed boats were prepared at Le Havre for the purpose of disembarking troops.

Bombardment
The squadron Admiral Rodney was detached in the beginning of July with a small squadron and sailed from Spithead on 2 July, arrived off Le Havre.

Rodney's squadron consisted of the 60-gun ship of the line Achilles as flagship, four 50-gun ships, five frigates, a sloop, and six bomb ketches and anchored there placing the bomb vessels in the narrow channel of the river leading to Honfleur. The next day the attack commenced on the flat-bottomed boats and supplies which had been collected there. Over 3000 shells were fired at the principal targets – the magazines, batteries and the boats as well as into the town for fifty consecutive hours. Rodney, with some of his frigates, remained off the port for the rest of the year, and captured numerous prizes.

The bombardment did immense damage, while Rodney's fleet received little harm in return. A numerous body of French troops came down to the shore and under the cover of entrenchments and batteries kept up an active fire upon the assailants. The town was set on fire in several places and burned with great fury while the inhabitants fled.

Aftermath
The success of the venture, however, lured the British commanders into a false sense of security, making them believe it had been a greater setback than it had.  The French intended to capitalise on this, but scaled back their initial plans instead.

In summer 1759, the French Toulon fleet sailed out through the Straits of Gibraltar but was caught and defeated by a British fleet at the Battle of Lagos in August. In November of that year, the French Brest Squadron was handily defeated at the Battle of Quiberon Bay. With these two defeats combined – the invasion plans received a crippling blow.

The victory helped contribute to what became known as the Annus Mirabilis in Great Britain.

Line of battle
Ships of the line
  (60), flagship, Captain the Hon. Samuel Barrington
  (50), Captain John Lockhart
  (50), Captain John Hollwell
  (50), Captain Edward Wheeler
  (50), Captain George Darby
Frigates
  (36), Captain Hyde Parker
  (36), Captain Henry John Philips
  (32), Captain Samuel Hood
  (28), Captain Hon. Robert Boyle
  (28), Captain Thomas Graves
Sloop
  (8), Commander Hugh Bromedge
Bomb ketches
 , Commander Jonathan Faulknor
 , Commander James Orrok
 ,  Commander John Clarke
 Mortar, Commander Joseph Hunt
 , Commander Charles Inglis
 Blast, Commander Thomas Willis

References
Notes

Bibliography
 
 Russell Frank Weigley, The age of battles, p. 226
 
 

Naval battles of the Seven Years' War
Conflicts in 1759
1759 in France
Naval battles involving France
Naval battles involving Great Britain
Military raids